William Noel (19 March 1695 – 8 December 1762) was an English barrister, judge and politician who sat in the House of Commons for 35 years from 1722 to 1757.

Early life
Noel was the second son of Sir John Noel, 4th Baronet, of Kirkby Mallory, Leicestershire, and his wife Mary Clobery, youngest daughter and co-heiress of Sir John Clobery of Bradstone, Devon, and was born on 19 March 1695 at Kirkby Mallory, Sparkenhoe Hundred, Leicestershire. His older brother was Sir Clobery Noel, 5th Baronet. William Noel was educated at Lichfield grammar school in Staffordshire, under the Rev. John Hunter, and having been admitted a member of the Inner Temple on 12 February 1716, was called to the bar on 25 June 1721.

Career
He was returned again in a contest at the 1727 British general election. He acted with the Opposition speaking against the Hessians in 1731, and against the army in 1732. In December 1731, with Nicholas Fazakerley and Thomas Bootle, he defended Richard Francklin, a bookseller who was tried before Chief-justice Lord Raymond for publishing a libel in The Craftsman.

At the 1734 British general election he was returned again in a contest for Stamford. He became deputy-recorder of Stamford in 1736, and in 1738 became a king's counsel and a bencher of the Inner Temple (28 April). In Parliament, he spoke for the allowance to the Prince of Wales in 1737 and withdrew on the motion for the removal of Walpole in February 1741. He was returned unopposed at the 1741 British general election. In March 1742 he was elected to the secret committee on Walpole,  his name appearing in both the court and the opposition lists. He went over to the Government, and voted inconsistently, both for and against the Hanoverians over the following years. On 11 December 1746 he was appointed a member of the committee for preparing the articles of impeachment against the Jacobite Simon Fraser, 11th Lord Lovat, and during the trial in March 1747 replied to objections which Lovat had raised in his defence.

He was again returned for West Looe at the 1754 British general election. Through Lord Hardwicke's influence Noel succeeded Thomas Birch as a justice of the common pleas in March 1757, when he retired from parliament, but retained his post in Chester. On the accession of his nephew Sir Edward Noel, 6th Baronet to the barony of Wentworth in 1745, Noel assumed the courtesy title "The Honourable". He was described by Horace Walpole as "a pompous man of little solidity", and was held up to ridicule in The Causidicade, an anonymous satire.

Family
Noel married Elizabeth Trollope, third daughter of Sir Thomas Trollope, 3rd Baronet of Casewick, Lincolnshire. The couple had four daughters:

 Susannah Maria, who became the second wife of Thomas Hill of Tern Hall, Shropshire, and died on 14 February 1760, aged 41. Their son Noel Hill was created Baron Berwick on 19 May 1784.
 Anne, who died unmarried.
 Frances, who married Bennet Sherard, 3rd Earl of Harborough, on 3 July 1757, and died on 13 September 1760. 
 Elizabeth.

Noel died on 8 December 1762.

Notes

 
Attribution
 

1695 births
1762 deaths
English barristers
18th-century English judges
Younger sons of baronets
Members of the Inner Temple
Members of the Parliament of Great Britain for English constituencies
Members of the Parliament of Great Britain for West Looe
British MPs 1722–1727
British MPs 1727–1734
British MPs 1734–1741
British MPs 1741–1747
British MPs 1747–1754
British MPs 1754–1761